Evi Sappl (born 8 November 1947) is a German speed skater. She competed in two events at the 1968 Winter Olympics.

References

External links
 

1947 births
Living people
German female speed skaters
Olympic speed skaters of West Germany
Speed skaters at the 1968 Winter Olympics
People from Bad Tölz
Sportspeople from Upper Bavaria